MEF may stand for:

Military

 Malaita Eagle Force, a militant organization originating in the island of Malaita in the Solomon Islands
 Marine Expeditionary Force (MEF), one of the major deployable subdivisions of the United States Marine Corps; see 1st Marine Expeditionary Force, 2nd Marine Expeditionary Force, 3rd Marine Expeditionary Force
 Mediterranean Expeditionary Force
 Mesopotamian Expeditionary Force during the First World War

Organizations
 Mahratta Education Fund, Indian non-profit organisation
 Major Economies Forum on Energy and Climate Change
 Media Education Foundation
 MEF International School Istanbul
 Middle East Forum, an American conservative think tank
 Ministerio de Economía y Finanzas, the Uruguayan ministry of economics and finance
 Ministero dell’Economia e delle Finanze, the Italian ministry of economics and finance
 Ministry of Environment and Forests, India

Science/technology
 Managed Extensibility Framework, a software plugin framework, written by Microsoft
 Maximum Elevation Figure (flying)
 Maximal expiratory flow, another name for peak expiratory flow in spirometry
 Medial eye fields
 Metro Ethernet Forum
 Modernized e-File (MeF), an electronic system for filing U.S. income taxes
 Modified Energy Factor (Energy Star Rating Value, US Department of Energy (DOE))
 Mouse Embryonic Fibroblast
 Museo Paleontológico Egidio Feruglio collection code
 Myocyte Enhancer Factor (2)
 Mouse Embryonic Fibroblast (MEF) Isolation Enzyme 1
 Multiscale Electrophysiology Format, a data format used in electrophysiology

Transport
 Mei Foo station, Hong Kong, MTR station code